Algarve is a Portuguese wine region covering the same areas as its namesake region. The region is classified as a Vinho Regional (VR), a designation similar to a French vin de pays region. Located on the southern coast of Portugal, the region's wine industry is driven by the local tourist economy with very few wines being exported.

Wine regions
Within the Algarve region there are 4 major wine regions. Listed from west to east, these are:

Lagos DOC
Portimão DOC
Lagoa DOC
Tavira DOC

Grapes
The principle grapes of the Algarve region includes Arinto, Baga, Castelao Nacional, Fernao Pires, Periquita, Rabo de Ovelha, Tinta Amarela, Trincadeira das Pratas, Ugni blanc and Vital.

See also
List of Portuguese wine regions

References

Wine regions of Portugal